A gorge in field fortification is the "unexposed side of a fieldwork", typically the rear of an independent fieldwork or detached outwork in front of the main fortress or defensive position.

Outworks with open gorges 
Straith describes three commonly used classes of field work: "works open at the gorge, works enclosed all round and lines." He lists the following as works open at the gorge:

 Redan
 Lunette
 Redan with flanks
 Double Redan
 Tenaille-head
 Bastion-head 

Closed works are the redoubt, star fort and bastioned fort.

Gorges of 'half-closed works' were usually closed either by a parapet or stockade.

References

Literature 
 
 
 

Fortification (architectural elements)